This is a list of the National Register of Historic Places listings in Ipswich, Massachusetts.

This is intended to be a complete list of the properties and districts on the National Register of Historic Places in Ipswich, Massachusetts, United States. The locations of National Register properties and districts for which the latitude and longitude coordinates are included below, may be seen in an online map.

Essex County, of which Ipswich is a part, is the location of 461 properties and districts listed on the National Register. Ipswich itself is the location of 31 of these properties and districts.

Current listings

|}

See also

List of National Historic Landmarks in Massachusetts
National Register of Historic Places listings in Massachusetts
National Register of Historic Places listings in Essex County, Massachusetts

References

 
Ipswich

Ipswich, Massachusetts